Loud Planes Fly Low is the fifth album by the American band The Rosebuds, released in 2011 on Merge Records.

Track listing

References

2011 albums
The Rosebuds albums
Merge Records albums